R. Chandrasekar Gounder is an Indian politician. He was elected to the 14th Tamil Nadu Legislative Assembly from the Manapparai constituency in 2011 and retained his seat in the elections of 2016. He represents the All India Anna Dravida Munnetra Kazhagam party.

References 

Tamil Nadu MLAs 2011–2016
Tamil Nadu MLAs 2016–2021
All India Anna Dravida Munnetra Kazhagam politicians
Living people
Year of birth missing (living people)
Tamil Nadu politicians